The McLaren F1 LM is a track oriented iteration of the McLaren F1 built to honour the five McLaren F1 GTRs that competed and finished the 1995 24 Hours of Le Mans in first, third, fourth, fifth and thirteenth places overall. The LM is based on the McLaren F1 GTR and built on the standard F1 chassis, with modifications necessary for it to be a road legal car—but without the engine intake restrictions that racing regulations impose on the GTR racing car.

Background 

In late 1995, McLaren built five F1 LMs (LM for Le Mans) in honour of the five McLaren F1 GTR's that finished the 1995 24 Hours of Le Mans and took the overall win.

McLaren designed the standard F1 as an ultimate road car, in the sense that it strives to be comfortable and usable in everyday conditions despite being a potent sports car. However, the LM edition is a lower and stiffer, track-oriented vehicle, with a stripped down, bare interior, and solid aluminium bushings in place of the rubber bushings in the suspension system and without the Ground Plane Shear Centre system on the standard F1.

Of the production run of six, five F1 LMs were sold and the sixth, the Papaya orange prototype F1 LM, XP1 LM, was retained by McLaren and used as the platform for the continued development of the F1 chassis. This car was promised by McLaren CEO Ron Dennis to Formula One driver Lewis Hamilton if he won two Formula One World Championship titles. However, Lewis Hamilton left McLaren with his single World Championship title to drive for the rival Mercedes Formula One team in 2013 and the car still remains in possession of McLaren.

The F1 LMs can be identified by their Papaya orange paint. The F1 LM's were painted in this colour in memory and tribute to Bruce McLaren, whose race colour was Papaya orange.

It has been discovered however, that contrary to the official word from McLaren at the time, only four (including the prototype) of the LMs were originally painted 'Papaya' orange, with two of the three delivered to The Sultan of Brunei being painted black with graphics.

Specifications and modifications

Weight 

Engine 

The F1 LM also used the same engine as the 1995 F1 GTR without the race-mandated restrictors. The engine has a compression ratio of 11.0:1 and produces  at 7,800 rpm. The total weight and horsepower of the car gives it a weight to power ratio of 0.29 hp/lb.

Aerodynamics 

The aerodynamics of the LM is directly derived from the GTR race car.

The bodywork of the vehicle has the addition of a larger cooling duct at the nose of the machine and cooling ducts on either side of the car for the brakes where the storage lockers are seen on the standard F1.
In the place of the small dynamic rear wing seen on the regular F1 there is a considerably larger, manually adjustable CFRP rear wing mounted on the back of the vehicle, it has a CFRP splitter at the front, side skirts and extensions for the wheel arches to increase downforce and thus give the car more grip. The car also features the diffuser from the GTR race car.

Tyres 
The McLaren F1 LM uses Michelin SX-MXX3 tyres and features specially-designed 18-inch (457 mm) magnesium alloy wheels.

The tyres at the front are 275/35 ZR 18, while at the rear 345/35 ZR 18.

The front wheels are 10.85 x 18 inches and at the rear 13.00 x 18 inches.

Brakes 

The carbon ceramic brakes on the GTR are not present on the LM, the front and rear calipers on the brakes are four-piston monobloc light alloy callipers, ventilated using the cooling system from a 1995 F1 GTR.

Gearbox, clutch and miscellaneous 

The LM has an upgraded gearbox with gun drilled driveshaft derived from the F1 GTR, tripod CV joint and straight cut gears, although the gear ratios are identical to the standard F1, i.e. 3.23:1, 2.19:1, 1.71:1, 1.39:1, 1.16:1, 0.93:1, with a final drive of 2.37:1. The LM does not benefit from the magnesium gearbox casing of the 1996 F1 GTR.

The clutch of the LM is a hydraulic remote actuation triple plate carbon/carbon clutch, the clutch is 200 mm (7.87 in) in diameter.

Performance 

The F1 LM is considered the quickest incarnation of the McLaren F1 road cars through the gears and in overall track performance. It has a tested 0- time of 3.9 seconds due to wheelspin at the start, 0- in 6.7 seconds and was once the holder of many world records, including the 0-100-0 mph record it completed in 11.5 seconds (over a distance of ) when driven by Andy Wallace at the disused airbase RAF Alconbury in Cambridgeshire.

Acceleration 

 0–: 3.9 seconds
 0–: 6.7 seconds

Top speed 

 , which is less than the standard version due to added aerodynamic drag.

References 

F1 LM
Rear mid-engine, rear-wheel-drive vehicles
Coupés
1990s cars